Relations between Afghanistan and China have been mostly friendly throughout history, with trade relations between these regions date back to at least the Han dynasty with the profitable Silk Road. Presently, both countries have embassies in Beijing and Kabul respectively, and the two countries share a narrow international border.

Since the establishment of the modern nation of Afghanistan (1709), relations have been variously positive or tense, but in recent history have been more friendly including during most of the 20th century, with China extending economic aid and multi-million dollar loans to develop Afghanistan during the early Cold War period. This friendship was briefly interrupted after the Sino-Soviet split and the Soviet invasion of Afghanistan (1979), with the USSR installing pro-Soviet and anti-Chinese regimes in Afghanistan. However, since the withdrawal of Soviet troops and détente of Soviet and subsequent Russian-Chinese relations, China-Afghan relations have also improved significantly in the 21st century.

Since the United States invasion initiating the War in Afghanistan, Chinese political involvement initially has been somewhat limited, but trade relations have still been continuing with China as Afghanistan's largest trading partner and China giving Afghanistan millions of dollars in aid throughout the war. China's influence and shuttle diplomatic role in Afghanistan has also been growing over the years, and China could help broker peace in the war-torn country.

History (Han to Qing)
Various Chinese dynasties have also occupied parts of Afghanistan and Central Asia around their current border; and Afghanistan has historically been at the center of the lucrative Silk Road.

Han dynasty 
The Han defeated the Dayuan in the Han-Dayuan war, thereby establishing Chinese control over parts of northern Afghanistan. Later the Han dynasty set up the Protectorate of the Western Regions to protect Silk Road trade through Central Asia. In antiquity, the region that is now Afghanistan was known for its devotion to Buddhism, which had been founded in India in the 5th century BC. Chinese records from the Han dynasty refer to Kabul as "Kao-fu", which is described as a wealthy cite located in the Hindu Kush mountains on a strategic location on the trade routes linking Central Asia to India. A Buddhist monk from what is now Afghanistan arrived in China in 2 BC and converted the first Chinese to Buddhism. Afghanistan was often visited by Chinese Buddhist pilgrims on their way to India in antiquity, and Buddhist sites such as Balkh and the Buddhas of Bamyan attracted many Chinese visitors. Chinese records credit craftsmen from Afghanistan with producing the first glass in China between 424 and 428 AD, through archaeological evidence suggests that glass was being produced earlier in China.

Tang dynasty 
In 605, emissaries from what is now Afghanistan arrived in Luoyang (at the time China's capital) to pay tribute to the Emperor in exchange for greater rights to trade with China. When the Tang dynasty was established in 618 AD, the claim to see Afghanistan as part of China's sphere of influence was inherited, a claim that successive Tang emperors were willing to enforce via military means.

During the Tang dynasty parts of Afghanistan were under the control of China's Protectorate General to Pacify the West. In 659, Soghd and Ferghana, along with cities like Tashkent, Samarkand, Balkh, Herat, and Kabul, became part of the protectorate under Emperor Gaozong. Afghanistan's Herat and Uzbekistan's Bukhara and Samarkand became part of the Tang protectorate. The Indian historian K. P. S. Menon wrote about the Chinese "performed the remarkable feat of sending an army of 100,000 men which marched up the Pamirs from Kashgar" and then crossed Afghanistan to occupy the Hunza Valley in what is now Pakistan under Tang General Gao Xianzhi.

The defeat of the Western Turks and the defeat of the Sassanids by the Arabs had facilitated the Chinese expansion under Emperor Gaozong into Herat, northeastern Iran and Afghanistan (Tukharistan), Bukhara, Samarkand, Tashkent, and Soghdiana, which previously belonged to the western Turks.

During the Tang dynasty, a period of prosperity and wealth that many Chinese see as one of the highlights of their history, trade flourished along the Silk Road between Afghanistan and China. The Chinese Buddhist monk Xuanzang passed through Afghanistan on his way to India and described with awe his wonder at viewing the Buddhas of Bamyan. Religions such as Nestorian Christianity first reached China in the Tang dynasty via Afghanistan, to be followed later by Islam.

The Church of the East Christians like the Bactrian Priest Yisi of Balkh helped the Tang dynasty general Guo Ziyi militarily crush the Sogdian-Turk led An Lushan rebellion, with Yisi personally acting as a military commander and Yisi and the Church of the East were rewarded by the Tang dynasty with titles and positions as described in the Xi'an Stele.

Mongol Empire 
Both regions were briefly unified under the Mongol Empire. This also contributed to the sustenance and growth of the Silk Road.

Silk Road 
Trade relations between Afghanistan and China mostly involved trade of fruit and tea via caravans through Xinjiang and the Wakhan Corridor on the border between the two countries. Buddhist monks from the area of what is now Afghanistan were involved in the Silk Road transmission of Buddhism to Han dynasty China. Faxian traveled to Afghanistan in the 5th century. In the 21st century, China and Afghanistan are making efforts to revive a New Silk Road through the Belt and Road Initiative.

Qing dynasty 

Around 1760, tensions in Central Asia and Turkistan (including Xinjiang) were high due to threats by China's Qing empire against the various Muslim rulers in the region. Relations between the Afghan Durranis and Qing was cold - Ahmad Shah Abdali, the powerful Afghan emir, was unhappy with China's expansion into that region, with the Chinese having dispatched an envoy to the Kazakh sultanate. Rulers in the region including Irdana Khan (the Khan of Khokand) and Kyrgyz chiefs asked Ahmad Shah to protect the area from an attack by "non-believers".

Ahmad Shah sent a letter to a Qing court in 1762 demanding a withdrawal from Muslim territories. He also mentioned (likely as a threat) the Third Battle of Panipat that occurred a year earlier, when he defeated the Maratha Empire in northern India. Subsequently, Ahmad Shah sent troops to Khokand and Tashkent (probably as a precaution) in case of a Qing attack; however according to Russian records the Afghans had a coordinated plan to attack Chinese territory. Chinese troops were also at Kashgar ready for a potential war with the Afghans.

War between Afghanistan and China however did not break out. In a change of mood, the Afghans sent an envoy to Beijing gifting four splendid horses to emperor Qianlong in 1763. The horses became the subject of Giuseppe Castiglione's series of paintings, Four Afghan Steeds. However, the envoy failed to make a good impression to Qianlong after refusing to perform the kowtow, a bow to the emperor that was customary for visitors as a sign of respect. The Qing courts viewed the Afghans as troublemakers and discouraged Ahmad Shah from sending more envoys, pointing out that other visiting Muslim envoys as well as Russian and European ones had performed the bow. Qianlong further disapproved the Durrani conquests of India in a letter, in which he also demonstrated himself to Ahmad Shah by saying that he was:

Later that decade, Ahmad Shah together with the Khanate of Bukhara invaded Badakhshan and killed its ruler Sultan Shah for betraying Khojas to the Qing. Qianlong did not intervene to save Sultan Shah from the Afghans.

20th century 
Sino-Afghan relations remained ambiguous in the early part of the 20th century, with mainly opium and horses being traded between the border.

World War II 
Chinese Muslims fought against Japan in World War II. In order to gain war support for China from Muslim countries, Hui Muslim Ma Fuliang (馬賦良) and Uyghur Muslim Isa Yusuf Alptekin visited Egypt, Syria, and Turkey in 1939. The Indian leaders Tagore and Gandhi and Pakistani leader Jinnah both discussed the war with the Chinese Muslim delegation led by Ma Fuliang. In Turkey İsmet İnönü met with the Chinese Muslim delegation. Newspapers in China reported the visit. Ma Fuliang and Isa were working for Zhu Jiahua.

The bombardment of Chinese Muslims by the warplanes of the Japanese was reported in the newspapers of Syria. Afghanistan, Iran, Iraq, Syria, and Lebanon were all toured by the Chinese delegation. The Foreign Minister, Prime Minister, and President of Turkey met with the Chinese Muslim delegation after they came via Egypt in May 1939. Gandhi and Jinnah met with the Hui Ma Fuliang and Uyghur Isa Alptekin as they denounced Japan.

Early Cold War and creation of PRC 
The Kingdom of Afghanistan recognized the People's Republic of China in January 1950, although diplomatic relations did not begin until January 20, 1955. Abdul Samad was the first Afghan Ambassador posted to Peking in 1955. Afghanistan was also one of the first countries to recognize the PRC.

Premier Zhou Enlai and Vice Premier He Long visited Afghanistan in January 1957. This was the first ever visit taken by Chinese leadership to Afghanistan in the history of Sino-Afghan relations. During the visit, the Chinese Premier and Vice Premier met with King Mohammad Zahir Shah of Afghanistan, and held respective talks with Prime Minister Mohammad Daud Khan, Vice Prime Minister Ali Mohammed and Vice Prime Minister and Foreign Minister Mr. Mohammad Naim. The Chinese Premier's visit to Afghanistan enhanced mutual understanding between the two countries and laid a solid foundation for the development of friendly relations between China and Afghanistan. In October 1957, Prime Minister Mohammad Daud of Afghanistan visited China under China's invitation. During the visit, he held meetings with Chairman Mao Zedong, Vice Chairman Zhu De and Chairman Liu Shaoqi of the Standing Committee of the National People's Congress of China.

China's lack of support for Afghan claims in Pakistan's Pashtunistan was disapproved by Kabul, and the Sino-Soviet split (with Afghanistan being close to the Soviet Union) was also a negative; however relations remained generally positive. Trade pacts as well as a treaty of friendship and non-aggression were signed between the two nations in 1960.

On 22 November 1963 Beijing and Kabul signed the Boundary Treaty. This treaty settled the territorial dispute over the Afghan-controlled Wakhan on the border between Badakhshan Province in Afghanistan and the Xinjiang Uyghur Autonomous Region in China. The China-Afghanistan border is 92.45 kilometers long.

Soviet invasion of Afghanistan (1979) 
Following the Saur Revolution in Afghanistan, China reacted negatively to the Democratic Republic of Afghanistan as it viewed it as a Soviet advance and a threat to its friendly relations with Iran and Pakistan. Beijing recognized the new government two weeks after the revolution.

On 27 December 1979, Soviet troops were deployed in Afghanistan. On December 30, Chinese government made announcement condemning the Soviet military invasion, and refused to recognize the Soviet-backed Karmal government. The official relationship was stopped, and the Chinese embassy was degraded to representative office, and only dealt with consular and visa issues.

During the Sino-Soviet split, strained relations between China and the USSR resulted in bloody border clashes and mutual backing for the opponent's enemies. China and Afghanistan had neutral relations with each other during the King's rule. When the pro-Soviet Afghan Communists seized power in Afghanistan in 1978, relations between China and the Afghan communists quickly turned hostile. The Afghan pro-Soviet communists supported China's then-enemy Vietnam and blamed China for supporting Afghan anticommunist militants. China responded to the Soviet war in Afghanistan by supporting the Afghan mujahideen and ramping up their military presence near Afghanistan in Xinjiang. China acquired military equipment from America to defend itself from Soviet attack. By the early 1980s, China viewed Afghanistan as posing a moderately high risk because of its ties with the Soviet Union.

Soviet withdrawal from Afghanistan was one of the conditions pushed by China for any détente in China-Soviet relations. China saw the Soviet presence as a regional threat to itself (to prevent the USSR from encircling China) and a threat to its ally Pakistan. With possible United States support, China supplied weapons to Afghan guerrillas against the Soviet puppet government.

Post Soviet collapse (1991) 
China distanced itself from Afghanistan following the rise of the Taliban in the 1990s. China severed its diplomatic relationship with the Taliban and did not recognize the Taliban government. Concerned by the Taliban's connections to East Turkistan terrorist organizations, Chinese security concerns increased. China also feared that chaos in Afghanistan could spill across the countries' border.

Motivated by its concerns about violence in Xinjiang, China sent a delegation to meet with the Taliban in early 1999. In November 2000, China's then ambassador to Pakistan, Lu Shulin, became the first senior representative of a non-Muslim country to meet with Mullah Omar.

21st century 
For the past two decades, China has kept a low profile in Afghanistan, focusing more on resource and material mining than on peace brokering. However, since 2014 China has assumed an increased responsibility in maintaining regional stability.

Afghanistan war 
After the fall of the Taliban regime after the United States intervention in 2001, relations between China and Afghanistan had greatly improved and were reestablished. In December 2001, China sent to Afghanistan a working team of the Ministry of Foreign Affairs, which attended the Afghan Interim Administration's foundation ceremony and sent a message of congratulations to President Hamid Karzai.

The establishment of Afghanistan's new government drew the two countries closer. In January 2002, President Karzai visited China, and met respectively with Chinese President Jiang Zemin and Premier Zhu Rongji. The two sides exchanged the notes of China providing 30 million yuan of emergent material aid and US$1 million in cash to Afghanistan. President Jiang Zemin announced that China would provide US$150 million-worth of assistance to Afghanistan for its reconstruction. The 30 million yuan of emergent material aid had been delivered to Kabul by the end of March 2002. The Chinese Embassy in Afghanistan was reopened on February 6.

In May 2002, Chinese Foreign Minister Tang Jiaxuan visited Afghanistan. During the visit, the Chinese Foreign Minister met with Hamid Karzai, Chairman of the Interim Administration of Afghanistan and ex-King Zahir, and held talks with his counterpart Mr. Abdullah Abdullah. The two sides signed the Agreement on Economic and Technical Cooperation of US$30 million Chinese aid to Afghanistan. In November, Afghan Foreign Minister Abdullah Abdullah visited China. During his visit, the Chinese and Afghan sides exchanged the notes of China providing US$1 million of material aid to Afghanistan. In December, China, together with the other 5 neighboring countries of Afghanistan signed Kabul Declaration on Good Neighborly Relations, reaffirming its commitment to respect the sovereignty and territorial integrity of Afghanistan and to continuously support Afghanistan's peace process and reconstruction.

In February 2003, President Karzai passed through China twice. In May, the Vice President of Afghan Islamic Transitional Government Nematullah Sharhrani paid a working visit to China. During the visit he held talks with Chinese Vice President Zeng Qinghong and met with NPC Chairman Wu Bangguo and Premier Wen Jiabao. The two sides signed three cooperative documents including the Agreement of Economic and Technical Cooperation, under which the Chinese Government provides US$15 million grant to the Afghan Government.

After 2012, China began to occupy a more prominent place in China's foreign relations towards its neighboring countries, particularly under China's new neighborhood policy established during the early years of the Xi Jinping administration.

Chinese peacekeeping efforts 

China expanded its peacemaking role in the Afghan war.

Since 2017, foreign minister Wang Yi initiated shuttle diplomacy between Pakistan and Afghanistan, who over the course of the war have accused each other of attacks and bombings. The three countries—China, Afghanistan, and Pakistan—have agreed to establish a trilateral dialogue forum and revive the Shanghai Cooperation Organisation's Contact Group on Afghanistan.

Some claim the China–Pakistan Economic Corridor would be the most effective way to integrate Afghanistan into the regional Belt and Road Initiative.

To counter regional instability, China has since 2015 joined the Quadrilateral Coordination Group and the Moscow Format. In 2015, China hosted negotiations between the Taliban and Afghan officials in Xinjiang's capital Urumqi. In 2014 to 2018, China developed good ties with the Taliban by meeting them several times. The US has also stepped up negotiation efforts with the Taliban.

2021 US withdrawal and Taliban offensive 

In 2021, following the withdrawal of United States troops from Afghanistan and the ensuing Taliban offensive, the Chinese government signaled its willingness to work with a new Taliban-led government. The Chinese government is concerned about the possibility of Taliban support for militants in Xinjiang.

2022 earthquake
In June 2022, a magnitude 5.9 earthquake killed over 1,150 people and caused widespread destruction in southeastern Afghanistan. China participated in the humanitarian efforts by providing  worth of humanitarian assistance for the affected. At least seven Chinese planes arrived to distribute aid. In a press conference, the Taliban thanked Chinese officials for the assistance.

Military cooperation

The Chinese People's Liberation Army trained and supported the Afghan mujahideen during the Soviet-Afghan war. The training camps were moved from Pakistan into China itself. Anti-aircraft missiles, rocket launchers and machine guns, valued at hundreds of millions, were given to the mujahideen by the Chinese. Chinese military advisors and army troops were present with the Mujahidin during training.

In September 2018, Afghanistan's Ambassador to China, Janan Mosazai, announced that China will train Afghan soldiers in China, joining plane crews already training in China.

Badakshan base

China is reportedly building a base for the Afghan Armed Forces in Badakhshan, with the goal of strengthening counter-terrorism cooperation. Per General Dawlat Waziri of the Ministry of Defense, China will cover all of the base's material and technical expenses.

China wants to ensure stability of the region to counter the East Turkistan Islamic Movement (ETIM). The ETIM has bases in Afghanistan, and China wants to prevent them from 'radicalizing' Uyghurs in Xinjiang and prevent them from carrying jihadist and terrorist attacks on the mainland.

According to Ferghana news:The Afghan delegation led by Defence Minister Tariq Shah Bahrami visited China during which the parties agreed to build the base. Tariq Shah with his Chinese colleague General Chang Wanquan and other military officials discussed security issues and agreed to cooperate on fighting terrorism in the Afghan province of Badakhshan and the entire northern region.According to General Amarhel of Afghanistan, many Chinese Uyghurs were seen receiving training from the Taliban and Al-Qaeda.

In June 2014, at China's request, Pakistan launched a successful military counterattack against the Taliban in North Waziristan. The Taliban movement in North Pakistan allegedly hosted the ETIM.

As of December 2017, China has promised to provide $85 million for Afghan army to create a 'mountain brigade' to defend the Afghan-Chinese border, a move welcomed by the Afghanistan military.

According to Rupert Stone of TRT World,Beijing has also been concerned about what they call the threat posed by Uighur and other terrorists using Afghanistan as a base for attacks against the Chinese mainland. In response, China has intensified security on its border, reportedly engaging in joint patrols with Afghan forces and building a base in Badakhshan province, while also launching the Quadrilateral Coordination and Cooperation Mechanism (QCCM) with Afghanistan, Pakistan and Tajikistan.

Economic cooperation

China is Afghanistan's largest foreign investor.

Since 2007 it has provided Afghanistan telecom equipment. China also purchased rare mineral rights, an investment the US supported.

Since 2010, China has increased its economic aid and investment in Afghanistan, notably with announcement by Metallurgical Corporation of China (MCC) pledging $3.5 billion to develop Aynak Copper mines. China has since been mining copper outside of Kabul.

Between 2012 and 2013 China lent $240 million in aid and pledged a similar amount over the next four years.

In 2016 the two countries signed a memorandum of understanding, with Beijing pledging at least $100 million to Kabul. In September 2016, the first direct train crossed from China to Hairatan. There are also plans of air corridors between Ürümqi and Kabul.

Since 2017 it has built fiber optic cables for Afghanistan.

As of June 2018, China started extracting oil in the Amu Darya basin. In January 2023, Chinese oil extractor Asia Petroleum and Gas Co (CAPEIC) signed its first major contract with the Taliban-led government worth US$150 million a year to further expand oil extraction from the Amu Darya basin and develop an oil reserve in the country's northern Sar-e Pol Province. The projects would create about 3000 jobs in the region. A Chinese mining company is also in talks to extend a resource contract over the continued operation of a copper mine in eastern Logar province.

Belt and Road Initiative (BRI) 

Success of China's BRI depends on the stability and success of China's neighbor Afghanistan. Afghanistan would fit nicely into the BRI, providing the shortest route between China and the Middle East, Persian gulf and Arabian sea; as well as helping develop and repair Afghanistan's infrastructure.

Regional instability could threaten not just BRI but also the China–Pakistan Economic Corridor (CPEC).

One major initiative is the 'Five-nations railway' linking China, Iran, Kyrgyzstan, Afghanistan, and Tajikistan, with routes also connecting Afghanistan to Pakistan.

The CPEC would be the most efficient way to integrate Afghanistan into the BRI, providing Afghanistan the most direct access to the sea via Pakistan. Despite enmity between Pakistan and India, with mutual Chinese cooperation, India has agreed to cooperate with Pakistan on the effort. China and India have cooperated on training Afghanistan diplomats in New Delhi as security is a common ground for the two countries. Both see al-Qaeda, ISIS-Khorasan, ETIM, Lashkar-e-Taiba, the Haqqani Network, and the Islamic Movement of Uzbekistan (IMU) as threats to regional peace and prosperity.

China has also cooperated with the US on increasing stability.

According to Zhao Hong, Afghanistan also helps China implement its 'March West' strategy to 'expand economic and strategic influence in Central Asia, the Middle East, and beyond.'

Zhu Yongbiao also sees China playing an increased role in the region in the near future.

See also
 Afghan Ambassador to China
 Shanghai Cooperation Organisation

References

Sources

External links

 Chinese Embassy in Afghanistan
 Embassy of Afghanistan in Beijing, China
 Sino-Afghan relations

 
China
Bilateral relations of China